François Felix Eugene Daumas (3 January 1915 - 6 October 1984) was a French Egyptologist who was director of the Institut français d'archéologie orientale from 1959 to 1969.

References

French archaeologists
French Egyptologists
1915 births
1984 deaths
Members of the Institut Français d'Archéologie Orientale